Mikel Erentxun (born 23 February 1965) is a Venezuelan-born Spanish rock musician of Basque heritage.  Formerly with the group Duncan Dhu, he started his solo career in 1992.  He has released 16 albums as a solo artist and has covered  The Smiths' song, "There Is a Light That Never Goes Out", as "Esta luz nunca se apagará", as well as Morrissey's "Everyday Is Like Sunday" as "Todo es Igual Siempre".  He has collaborated with Mark Gardener, Robert Quine, drummer Pete Thomas, Lloyd Cole, Matthew Sweet and Fred Maher.  In 2005 the band the Lightning Seeds sued Erentxun for alleged plagiarism of their song "Pure", but it was finally dismissed.

Discography 

Albums
 Naufragios (1992)
 El abrazo del Erizo (1995)
 Acróbatas (1998)
 7 Años (1999)
 Te dejas ver (2000)
 Ciudades de Paso (2003)
 Éxitos (2004)
  (2006)
 Tres Noches en el Victoria Eugenia (2008)
 Detalle del Miedo (2010)
 24 Golpes (2012)
 Electrica PKWY (Limited edition) (2012)
 Corazones (2015)
 Corazón Salvaje EP (2015)
 El hombre sin sombra (2017)
 Live at the Roxy (2018)
 Amigos de Guardia (2021)

Singles
 A un minuto de ti
 Esta luz nunca se apagará
 Jugando con el tiempo
 Miénteme
 Lentamente
 De espaldas a mí
 Suelta las riendas de mi corazón
 El cielo es el color de las hormigas
 Ahora sé que estás
 El abrazo de erizo
 ¿Quién se acuerda de ti?
 A pleno sol
 Todo es igual siempre
 Tu nombre en los labios
 California
 Fácil
 Rara vez
 La orilla de carla
 Mañana
 En el sur
 Loco de atar
 Grandes éxitos
 Esos días
 A un minuto de ti (2004 rerecorded version)

References 

1965 births
Living people
Spanish male singer-songwriters
Spanish singer-songwriters
Spanish rock singers
Spanish guitarists
Spanish male guitarists
Basque musicians
Basque singers
Basque-language singers
Rock en Español musicians